is a Japanese shōnen manga magazine, focusing on new manga as well as video games based on popular manga. The magazine's debut was in 1990 by Shueisha under the Jump line of magazines.

History 
A prototype magazine called Hobby's Jump was launched in the 80s as a spin-off issue of Monthly Shōnen Jump. Hobby's Jump was announced discontinued, and a new magazine called V Jump arrived. V Jump is a video game magazine, namely for the Dragon Quest and Final Fantasy series, as well as many shōnen manga. Akira Toriyama designed the magazine's mascot character , who was named via a reader poll.

V Jump has also taken many series from Weekly Shōnen Jump, such as Shadow Lady created by Masakazu Katsura, which has had more success than ever in V Jump. Later on, the magazine published a sequel to the classic Weekly Shōnen Jump series Dr. Slump, characters from which appeared on the cover of the first issue of V Jump, titled The Brief Return of Dr. Slump (written by Takao Koyama and illustrated by Katsuyoshi Nakatsuru). After the Dr. Slump series, an adaptation of the spin-off anime Yu-Gi-Oh!: Duel Monsters GX called Yu-Gi-Oh! GX began serialization. The serialization of the series Yu-Gi-Oh! R ended on December 21, 2007.

V Jump Books 
V Jump Books is a line of V Jump manga and video game guides and some of the premiere editions. It mostly does guides for the series of Square Enix.  It is the other publisher of Disney Books in Japan along with Kodansha since it published books and guides for the Kingdom Hearts games.

Features 
V Jump's primary content is the information regards the video/arcade games and the card games. Therefore, there are limited numbers of manga titles have been serialized in V Jump. Most of the manga titles in V Jump are the comicalization of the animation and the video/card games.

Series
There are currently seven manga titles being regularly serialized in V Jump.

Former series 
The Brief Return of Dr. Slump
Bakuen CAMPUS Guardress
Digimon Adventure V-Tamer 01
Digimon Next
Digimon Xros Wars
Dragon Ball: Episode of Bardock
Dragon Quest: Souten no Soura
Dub & Peter 1
Gaist Crusher First
Go! Go! Ackman
Haō Taikei Ryū Knight
Kinnikuman II-Sei: All Chōjin Dai Shingeki
Onmyō Taisenki
Saint Seiya (last chapter only)
Shadow Lady
Slime MoriMori
Soldier of Savings Cashman
Viewtiful Joe
Yu-Gi-Oh! GX
Yu-Gi-Oh! R
Yu-Gi-Oh! 5D's
Yu-Gi-Oh Zexal
Yu-Gi-Oh! Arc-V
Yu-Gi-Oh! SEVENS
Z/X: Code Reunion

Circulation

References

External links
 V-Jump WEB 
 Shueisha Web Information official site 

1993 establishments in Japan
Anime magazines published in Japan
Magazines established in 1993
Magazines published in Tokyo
Monthly manga magazines published in Japan
Shueisha magazines
Video game magazines published in Japan
Shōnen manga magazines